TIY may refer to:

Tidjikja Airport (IATA airport code TIY), Tagant, Mauritania
Tin Yiu stop (MTR station code TIY), Hong Kong